Robert Curthose, or Robert II of Normandy ( – February 1134), was the eldest son of William the Conqueror and succeeded his father as Duke of Normandy in 1087, reigning until 1106. Robert was also an unsuccessful claimant to the throne of the Kingdom of England. The epithet "Curthose" had its origins in the Norman French word courtheuse 'short stockings' and was apparently derived from a nickname given to Robert by his father; the chroniclers William of Malmesbury and Orderic Vitalis reported that William the Conqueror had derisively called Robert brevis-ocrea ("short boot").

Robert's reign as Duke is noted for the discord with his brothers William II and Henry I in England. Robert mortgaged his duchy to finance his participation in the First Crusade, where he was an important commander. Eventually, his disagreements with Henry I led to defeat in the Battle of Tinchebray in 1106, and lifelong captivity, with Normandy temporarily absorbed as a possession of England.

Early life

Robert was the eldest son of William the Conqueror, the first Norman king of England, and Matilda of Flanders. Estimates of Robert's birth-date range between 1051 and 1053. As a child he was betrothed to Margaret, the heiress of Maine, but she died before they could be wed, and Robert did not marry until his late forties. In his youth he was reported to be courageous and skilful in military exercises. He was, however, also prone to laziness and weakness of character that discontented nobles and the King of France exploited to stir discord with his father William. He was unsatisfied with the share of power allotted to him and quarrelled with his father and brothers fiercely. In 1063, his father made him the Count of Maine in view of his engagement to Margaret, and Robert may have had independent rule in Maine. The county remained under Norman control until 1069 when the county revolted and reverted to Hugh V of Maine.

In 1077, Robert instigated his first insurrection against his father as the result of a prank played by his younger brothers William Rufus and Henry, who had dumped a full chamber-pot over his head. Robert was enraged and, urged on by his companions, started a brawl with his brothers that was only interrupted by the intercession of their father. Feeling that his dignity was wounded, Robert was further angered when King William failed to punish his brothers. The next day Robert and his followers attempted to seize the castle of Rouen. The siege failed, but, when King William ordered their arrest, Robert and his companions took refuge with Hugh of Chateauneuf-en-Thymerais. They were forced to flee again when King William attacked their base at Rémalard.

Exile 

Robert fled to Flanders to the court of his uncle Robert I, Count of Flanders, before plundering the county of the Vexin and causing such mayhem that his father King William allied himself with King Philip I of France to stop his rebellious son. Relations were not helped when King William discovered that his wife, Robert's mother Queen Matilda, was secretly sending her son Robert money. At a battle in January 1079, Robert unhorsed King William in combat and succeeded in wounding him, stopping his attack only when he recognised his father's voice. Humiliated, King William cursed his son. King William then raised the siege and returned to Rouen.

At Easter 1080, father and son were reunited by the efforts of Queen Matilda, and a truce lasted until she died in 1083. Robert seems to have left court soon after the death of his mother and spent several years travelling throughout France, Germany, and Flanders. He visited Italy seeking the hand of the great heiress Matilda of Tuscany (b. 1046) but was unsuccessful. During this period as a wandering knight Robert sired several illegitimate children. His son Richard seems to have spent much of his life at the royal court of his uncle William Rufus. This Richard was killed in a hunting accident in the New Forest in 1100 as was his uncle, King William Rufus, the same year. An illegitimate daughter was later married to Helias of Saint-Saens.

Reign as Duke of Normandy 

In 1087, the elder William died of wounds suffered from a riding accident during a siege of Mantes. At his death he reportedly wanted to disinherit his eldest son but was persuaded to divide the Norman dominions between his two eldest sons. To Robert he granted the Duchy of Normandy and to William Rufus he granted the Kingdom of England. The youngest son Henry was given money to buy land. Of the two elder sons Robert was considered to be much the weaker and was generally preferred by the nobles who held lands on both sides of the English Channel since they could more easily circumvent his authority.

At the time of their father's death the two brothers made an agreement to be each other's heir. However, this peace lasted less than a year when barons joined with Robert to displace Rufus in the Rebellion of 1088. It was not a success, in part because Robert never showed up to support the English rebels.

Robert took as his close adviser Ranulf Flambard, who had been previously a close adviser to his father. Flambard later became an astute but much-disliked financial adviser to William Rufus until the latter's death in 1100.

First Crusade and return 
In 1096, Robert formed an army and left Normandy to join the First Crusade to aid the Byzantine Empire against the Seljuk Turks and travel to Jerusalem. To raise money for the crusade he mortgaged his duchy to his brother William for the sum of 10,000 marks. 

Robert joined forces with his brother-in-law, count Stephen of Blois, and travelled together to Italy where he stayed during the winter of 1096/97. It is then that he most likely met his future wife, Sybil of Conversano, daughter of the wealthy Norman count of Conversano Geoffrey, and according to Orderic he fell in love with her.

Robert and Stephen were the last leading nobles to arrive at the gathering point in Constantinople but were welcomed with respect by Emperor Alexios and memories of Robert's grandfather's visit to Constantinople during his pilgrimage to Jerusalem. Both then swore, as had the other crusading leaders except for count Raymond of Toulouse, an oath to restore all cities that had been in Byzantine possession to Alexios and honour his superior status.

In the first week of June 1097 Robert and Stephen joined the main forces of the crusading army who at this point were besieging Nicea which was successfully conquered on the 19th of June. Robert then participated in all further military ventures during the crusade and was among the remaining crusading forces that took Jerusalem in August 1099. The fulfilment of his crusader vows was a personal triumph for Robert: he had shown military skills as well as the ability to mediate between different factions in the crusading forces. 

Robert left the Holy Land around September 1099 and returned via Constantinople, where Emperor Alexios showered him with gifts and offered him to enter into the service of the Byzantine Empire, but Robert declined. Instead, he travelled again to Southern Italy where he wintered again and married Sybil which also brought him a big dowry which enabled him to raise the necessary funds to buy back his duchy. However, when William II died on 2 August 1100 and Robert was still on the return journey and absent from Normandy, his brother Henry was able to seize the crown of England for himself.

Upon his return, Robert—urged by Flambard and several Anglo-Norman barons—claimed the English crown, on the basis of the short-lived agreement of 1087, and in 1101 led an invasion to oust his brother Henry. He landed at Portsmouth with his army, but the lack of popular support among the English (Anselm, the archbishop of Canterbury, was decidedly against him and the Charter of Liberties issued at Henry's coronation was well liked) as well as Robert's own mishandling of the invasion tactics enabled Henry to resist the invasion. Robert was forced by diplomacy to renounce his claim to the English throne in the Treaty of Alton. Orderic claimed that Robert squandered his wealth and became so poor that he had nothing to wear, but this seems unlikely given that Robert would have been reduced to penury so short after his return and might rather refer to his pre-Crusade persona.

Imprisonment and death 

In 1105, however, Robert's continual stirring of discord with his brother in England as well as civil disorder in Normandy itself prompted Henry to invade Normandy. Orderic reports on an incident at Easter 1105 when Robert was supposed to hear a sermon by the venerable Serlo, Bishop of Sées. Robert spent the night before sporting with harlots and jesters, and while he lay in bed sleeping off his drunkenness his unworthy friends stole his clothes. He awoke to find himself naked and had to remain in bed and missed the sermon.

In 1106, Henry defeated Robert's army decisively at the Battle of Tinchebray and claimed Normandy as a possession of the English crown, a situation that endured for almost a century. Captured after the battle, Robert was imprisoned in Devizes Castle in Wiltshire for twenty years before being moved to Cardiff.

In 1134, Robert died in Cardiff Castle in his early eighties. Robert Curthose, sometime Duke of Normandy, eldest son of the Conqueror, was buried in the abbey church of St. Peter in Gloucester. The exact place of his burial is difficult to establish—legend states that he requested to be buried before the High Altar. His effigy carved in bog oak, however, lies on a mortuary chest decorated with the attributed arms of the Nine Worthies (missing one—Joshua, and replaced with the arms of Edward the Confessor). The effigy dates from about 100 years after his death and the mortuary chest much later. The church subsequently has become Gloucester Cathedral.

Descendants
Robert married Sybilla of Conversano, daughter of Geoffrey of Brindisi, Count of Conversano (and a grandniece of Robert Guiscard, another Norman duke) on the way back from Crusade; they had one child:

William Clito, was born 25 October 1102 and became heir to the Duchy of Normandy. William Clito was unlucky all his life; his attempts to invade Normandy failed twice (1119 and 1125), his first marriage to a daughter of the Count of Anjou was annulled by his uncle's machinations, and even his late inheritance of the county of Flanders was mishandled. William Clito died in 1128 leaving no issue, thus leaving the field clear in the Norman succession (at least until the death of Henry I).

Sybilla, who was admired and often praised by chroniclers of the time, died shortly after the birth of her son. William of Malmesbury claims she died as a result of binding her breasts too tightly; both Robert of Torigny and Orderic Vitalis suggest she was murdered by a cabal of noblewomen led by her husband's mistress, Agnes Giffard.

Robert also had at least three illegitimate children – Richard, who died hunting in the New Forest in May 1100; William, a full brother of Richard; and a daughter, who married Helias of Saint-Saens. William went to the Holy Land after 1106 and was named lord of Tortosa, but disappears from the historical record after 1110.

Notes

Citations

References

Further reading 

 Also

External links

1050s births
1134 deaths
11th-century English people
12th-century English people
11th-century Dukes of Normandy
12th-century Dukes of Normandy
English people of French descent
Christians of the First Crusade
Dukes of Normandy
English knights
English Roman Catholics
French Roman Catholics
English people who died in prison custody
French people who died in prison custody
Heirs to the English throne
Prisoners in the Tower of London
Burials at Gloucester Cathedral
Pretenders to the English throne
House of Normandy
Rebellious princes
Children of William the Conqueror
Norman warriors
Anglo-Normans
Sons of kings
Year of birth uncertain
Non-inheriting heirs presumptive